Natalia Todorovschi (19 October 1931 – 2007) was a Romanian volleyball player. She competed in the women's tournament at the 1964 Summer Olympics.

References

External links
 

1931 births
2007 deaths
Romanian women's volleyball players
Olympic volleyball players of Romania
Volleyball players at the 1964 Summer Olympics
Volleyball players from Bucharest